Taylor William Fedun (born June 4, 1988) is a Canadian ice hockey defenceman who is currently playing within the Pittsburgh Penguins organization of the National Hockey League (NHL).

Playing career
Undrafted, Fedun played one final season in the Alberta Junior Hockey League (AJHL), skating in 50 games for the Spruce Grove Saints. He led all team defenceman in scoring with ten goals and 43 points.

The following season, Fedun joined the Princeton Tigers of ECAC Hockey conference in the NCAA Division I. In his first year with the club, he scored four goals and 14 points in 32 games. Fedun remained with the Tigers for an additional three seasons, where he became team captain in his final year.

On March 8, 2011, the Edmonton Oilers signed Fedun to a two-year contract.

Fedun impressed the Oilers at the 2011 Young Stars Tournament in Penticton, British Columbia, and continued to impress throughout the Oilers' pre-season games. He remained on the roster after other young high performers, such as Tyler Pitlick and Curtis Hamilton, had been assigned to the team's American Hockey League (AHL) affiliate, the Oklahoma City Barons.

Prior to the 2011–12 season, when the Oilers' roster sat at 32 players, with nine more needing to be cut before the team's final roster was made, Fedun was tripped by the Minnesota Wild's forward, Eric Nystrom, and fractured his femur during a preseason game while attempting to retrieve the puck and force an icing. Fedun suffered a complex fracture to his right femur and missed the entire 2011–12 season after a rod was put in his leg.  This was the second time the NHL's icing policy led to a fractured femur in the post-lockout era, with the previous injury occurring to former Wild defenseman Kurtis Foster in 2007. The icing rule was changed for the 2013–14 season to reduce the risk for potentially damaging collisions.

Fedun returned the following season, playing entirely with the Barons. In his first professional season, he recorded 27 points in 70 games. 

Fedun scored his first career NHL goal on November 5, 2013 against Florida Panthers' goaltender Jacob Markstrom. He appeared in an additional three games for the Oilers that season, scoring another goal. However, Fedun primarily played for the Barons that season.

With the Oilers not tendering Fedun a qualifying offer, he was released to free agency, and on July 1, 2014, signed a one-year contract with the San Jose Sharks. In his lone season with the organization, Fedun recorded four assists in seven games for the Sharks. He also appeared in 65 games for the team's AHL affiliate, the Worcester Sharks.

On July 1, 2015, Fedun signed a one-year, two-way contract as a free agent with the Vancouver Canucks. He skated in one game for the Canucks, as well as 63 for their AHL affiliate, the Utica Comets.

On July 1, 2016, Fedun left the Canucks organization and signed a one-year, two-way contract as a free agent with the Buffalo Sabres. He split the 2016–17 season between the Sabres and their AHL affiliate, the Rochester Americans. 

During the 2018–19 season, on November 10, 2018, while with the Rochester Americans, the Sabres traded Fedun to the Dallas Stars in exchange for a 2020 conditional seventh-round pick. On November 23, 2018, in his Stars debut, Fedun scored his first NHL goal in five years and third of his career in a 6–4 win against the Ottawa Senators. He stayed on the Stars' roster for the remainder of the season, posting new career highs of 4 goals and 11 points in 54 regular season games. He was also recognized by the Stars as the team's nomination for the Bill Masterton Trophy for his perseverance and dedication to hockey.

On June 27, 2019, Fedun agreed to a two-year, two-way contract extension to remain with Dallas.

Following his third season within the Stars organization, Fedun left as a free agent and was signed to a one-year, two-way contract with the Pittsburgh Penguins on July 28, 2021.

Career statistics

Awards and honours

References

External links

1988 births
Buffalo Sabres players
Canadian ice hockey defencemen
Canadian people of Ukrainian descent
Dallas Stars players
Edmonton Oilers players
Fort Saskatchewan Traders players
Living people
Oklahoma City Barons players
Princeton Tigers men's ice hockey players
Rochester Americans players
San Jose Sharks players
Ice hockey people from Edmonton
Spruce Grove Saints players
Texas Stars players
Undrafted National Hockey League players
Utica Comets players
Vancouver Canucks players
Wilkes-Barre/Scranton Penguins players
Worcester Sharks players
AHCA Division I men's ice hockey All-Americans